The Confédération Interalliée des Sous-Officiers de Réserve (CISOR), until 2013 also known as Association Européenne des Sous-Officiers de Réserve (AESOR), is the parent organisation of the national European NCO Reserve Corps within the NATO and also international. Currently CISOR consists 14 countries under the presidential lead of Germany. This non-profit organisation was founded 1 June 1963.

History 

Already before WWII existed various connections between the reserve officer corps of Belgium, France and the Netherlands, which started working together again in 1946, after the war. Those connections led to the first Congress event and the formal establishment of the „Interallied Confederation of Reserve Officers" (CIOR) 20 November 1948 in Brussels. Step-by-step the countries of Luxembourg (1952), Denmark (1956), Greece (1956), United States (1958), Italy (1960), Germany (1961), Great Britain (1963), Canada (1964), Norway (1966) and Spain (1992) also joined in.

CISOR was founded as Association Européenne des Sous-Officiers de Réserve (AESOR). That happened at the French Navy base of Toulon on 1 June 1963 and was following an initiative of the Fédération Nationale des Associations des Sous-Officiers de Réserve (FNASOR). The ratification of the different charters was made by the representatives of the NCO corpsmen of Belgium, Luxembourg, The Federal Republik of Germany, Switzerland and France.

Directives 

The current statute establishes that, together with civil and military authorities, European and national, CISOR contributes to the creation of a European defense system to safeguard freedom in Europe. These are the purposes:

a)  To participate to the creation of an international common Reservists Statute, for all EU and non EU countries.
b)  To boost the military improvement, theoretical and practical, of all members, in order to develop a constant defense and security spirit.

See also 

 Military pentathlon
 Interallied Confederation of Reserve Officers (CIOR)

References

Bibliography 

 Reserveunteroffiziere stellen sich international neu auf. loyal 05/13, p. 48
 AESOR Wettkämpfe in Toledo und Warschau. Informationsdienst für Reservisten & Reservistinnen, edited by Führungsstab der Streitkräfte, I/2012, p. 9

External links 

 CISOR-Homepage (English/French)
 CISOR-Statuten, Association of Slovenian officers (English)
 A.S.O.R. 44 (English/French)
 Sport hält Geist und Körper fit ..., Reservistenverband.de (German)
 Deutsches Nationalteam Militärischer Fünfkampf (German)
 CISOR on Facebook

1963 in military history
20th-century military alliances
21st-century military alliances
International military organizations
Military alliances involving Belgium
Military alliances involving France
Military alliances involving Italy
Military alliances involving Luxembourg
Military alliances involving Poland
Military alliances involving Spain
Military alliances involving the Netherlands
International organizations based in Europe
Organizations established in 1963